Pogonieae is an orchid tribe in the subfamily Vanilloideae.

Genera
Genera included in Pogonieae:
 Cleistes
 Cleistesiopsis
 Duckeella
 Isotria
 Pogonia

Pogoniopsis was previously included in Pogonieae, but is now placed in Triphorinae.

See also
 Taxonomy of the Orchidaceae

References

External links

 
Vanilloideae tribes